Meenkarappuzha River is one of the tributaries of the river Gayathripuzha. Gayathripuzha is one of the main  tributaries of the  Bharathapuzha River, the second-longest river in Kerala, south India.

References

Bharathappuzha